The Rio Grande shiner (Notropis jemezanus) is a species of ray-finned fish in the family Cyprinidae.
It is found in Mexico and the United States.

References

Rio Grande
Freshwater fish of Mexico
Freshwater fish of the United States
Fish of the Eastern United States
Fish of the Western United States
Fish described in 1875
Taxonomy articles created by Polbot